Iznaga is a surname. Notable people with the surname include:

Arián Iznaga, Cuban Paralympian athlete
Pedro Iznaga (born 1986), Cuban volleyball player

See also
Trinidad, Cuba